Maharaja Dharamraj Singh (18 August 1910 - 20 August 1959) was  the Raja of the princely state of Kawardha State from 1920 till 1948, when the Kawardha merged into Union of India. He later became active politician of Indian National Congress.

He was born on 18 August 1910 at Kawardha.  He succeeded his father Thakur Jadunath Singh upon his death in 1920. However, he was installed as Ruler on the 15th April 1932 on attaining his age. He was educated at Rajkumar College, Raipur
He married the daughter of Thakur Janardan Singh, a Raj Gond of Maihar in Central India and has two sons

The Kawardha Palace was designed and built in the period 1936-39 by Maharaja Dharamraj Singh, using the best Italian marble and stone, stands out in the 11 acres of lush green garden.

After independence of India, he became a politician. He represented Kawardha Vidhan Sabha constituency of undivided Madhya Pradesh Legislative Assembly by winning General election of 1957 as an Indian National Congress candidate.

He died on 20 August 1959 and his eldest son Vishwaraj Pratap Singh, inherited the title of Raja of Kawardha.

References 

Madhya Pradesh MLAs 1957–1962
Indian National Congress politicians
Indian royalty
Rajas of Kawardha
Lok Sabha members from Madhya Pradesh
1959 deaths
1910 births
Indian National Congress politicians from Madhya Pradesh